Aleksandar Jukic (born 26 July 2000) is an Austrian footballer who plays as a midfielder for Austria Wien in the Austrian Football Bundesliga.

Career

Austria Wien
A graduate of the club's youth academy, Jukic made his professional debut on 3 August 2018, appearing for Austria Wien II in a 4-3 victory over Horn, scoring his first professional goal in that same match. After emerging as a first team regular the following season, he made his debut for the senior team in July 2020, starting in a 1-0 victory over Mattersburg. He would score his first goal for the first team in November 2020, rescuing a late draw against St. Pölten. In March 2021, Jukic signed a three-year contract extension with the club.

Career statistics

Club

References

External links

Living people
2000 births
FK Austria Wien players
2. Liga (Austria) players
Austrian Football Bundesliga players
Austrian footballers
Austria youth international footballers
Footballers from Vienna
Association football midfielders